Willingdon Heights is a neighbourhood in Burnaby, British Columbia, Canada. It is named after a major Burnaby thoroughfare Willingdon Avenue connecting North Burnaby with Kingsway and the Metrotown area in the south. Willingdon Heights was developed significantly during construction spurred by the National Housing Act in 1944 that made mortgage money more widely available and provided joint loans for housing for veterans under the Integrated Housing Plan (IHP).

Location
Willingdon Heights is located between two major north–south roads - Boundary Road in the west and Willingdon Avenue in the east. Its northern border lies along busy Hastings Street while the equally busy Lougheed Highway marks its southern limits.

Shopping and transportation

Willingdon Heights is located close to Brentwood Mall, a popular shopping centre. Several big box stores (Staples, Office Depot) are located along the Lougheed Highway. A new Costco store was recently built east of Willingdon in the Still Creek industrial area.

Brentwood Station of the Millennium Line is nearby. A number of bus routes (#135, #123, #130, #27, #28) serve this area.

Community
Willingdon Heights Park, at 5.67 hectares, is the largest park in the area. It opened in 1949. It has a sports field and a community centre. In May 1952, the Willingdon Heights Community Church officially opened, after a concerted effort for over two years to establish a meeting place for the congregation. The effort was supported by Canadian Memorial, as at the time, 90% of Willingdon Heights was war veterans and their families.

References 

Neighbourhoods in Burnaby